Lawrence is a station on the Long Island Rail Road's Far Rockaway Branch in Lawrence, in Nassau County, New York, United States. The station is officially located at Lawrence Avenue and Bayview Avenue, two blocks west of Central Avenue. However, the actual location is two blocks north of Central Avenue, and Bayview Avenue is on the opposite side of the tracks. Lawrence Station is 21.8 miles (35.1 km) from Penn Station in Midtown Manhattan.

History
Lawrence station was originally built by the South Side Railroad of Long Island on July 29, 1869, but never had a station building until June 29, 1872. The station was rebuilt in 1905, the same year that the line was electrified, and the original station house was moved to a private location on July 31, 1906.

Station layout

This station has two high-level side platforms, each 10 cars long.

References

External links 

 Station from Lawrence Avenue from Google Maps Street View
 Platforms from Google Maps Street View
 Waiting room from Google Maps Street View
Flickr images

Five Towns
Long Island Rail Road stations in Nassau County, New York
Railway stations in the United States opened in 1869
1869 establishments in New York (state)